Major-General Thomas Tait Pitman,  (22 December 1868 – 8 March 1941) was a British cavalry officer, who was a general officer during the First World War.

Personal life
Thomas Tait Pitman was born on 22 December 1868, the son of Frederick Pitman, Writer to the Signet, Edinburgh.  He was one of eight brothers, including Frederick Islay Pitman and Charles Murray Pitman.  In 1920 he married Violet Mary, only daughter of Sir Michael Lakin, 1st Baronet.  He died on 8 March 1941.

Military career
Pitman entered the army in 1889 and served with the 11th (Prince Albert's Own) Hussars for 26 years. He was commissioned a second lieutenant on 9 October 1889, was promoted to lieutenant on 6 April 1891, and to captain on 16 April 1895. Seeing service in the North West Frontier campaign 1897–98, he then served in South Africa during the Second Boer War, where he was second-in-command of the 5th battalion of the Imperial Yeomanry. For his service he was mentioned in despatches (dated 1 June 1902, where he is commended for good service at Brakspruit on 11 April 1902). After the end of the war in June 1902, he left Cape Town in the SS Plassy in August, returning to Southampton the following month. On his return he resigned from the Imperial Yeomanry and returned to his regiment.

By the outbreak of the First World War, he was a lieutenant-colonel commanding the 11th Hussars and took them to the Western Front in August 1914.  He was wounded at the Battle of Messines (1914).  Later, he commanded the 4th Cavalry Brigade (1915–16) and the 2nd Cavalry Division (1918–19). He then became General Officer Commanding 48th (South Midland) Division in April 1926 before retiring in April 1930.

He was appointed Companion of The Most Honourable Order of the Bath (CB) in 1915 and Companion of the Order of St Michael and St George (CMG) in 1918 and mentioned in despatches six times.  He was Hon. Colonel of the 11th Hussars from 17 February 1926 to 9 October 1939.

References

Bibliography

External links
 

|-

1868 births
1941 deaths
British Army generals
British Army personnel of the Second Boer War
British Army cavalry generals of World War I
11th Hussars officers
Companions of the Order of St Michael and St George
Companions of the Order of the Bath